Monchoachi is a French writer, born in 1946 in Saint-Esprit, Martinique. Samuel Beckett's Endgame and Waiting for Godot are among the plays he has translated into Martinican Creole.

Monchoachi is also the founder of Lakouzémi, a political magazine and an annual political and poetic meeting which ran from 2007 to 2009. Its three annual meeting days saw poets meet in cockfighting arenas to talk, dance, recite and exchange ideas.

In an interview with the political review site , he spoke about the significance of the timing of these events:
 15 August – Ceremony at the Bois Caiman, 1791, 
 First Saturday in December – Columbus' arrival in the Lesser Antilles, 1493, 
 18 June – Treaty of Basseterre between Europeans and Kalinagos recognising the Kalinago nation, 1660.

Works 

 In Martinician Creole

 , La Ligue, 1980
 , Impr. Libres, 1979
  Éditions caribéennes, 1982
 , Imprimerie Desormeaux, 1983
 Samuel Beckett, traduction de  par Monchoachi, New legend, 2002
 Samuel Beckett, traduction de  par Monchoachi, New legend, 2002
 , avec Georges-Henri Léotin, Juliette Smeralda-Amon, Lakouasos, 2007

 French

 , Schœlcher, Presses universitaires créoles-GEREC ; Paris, l'Harmattan, 1992
 , Bordeaux, William Blake & Co, 2002
 , Sens, Obsidiane, 2002
 , Atlantica, 2002
 , Obsidiane 2012
 , Obsidiane 2016
 , Obsidiane 2021

Bibliography 

 Georges-Henri Léotin, Monchoachi, preface by Raphaël Confiant, 
  No. 72, 14 September 2016.

References 

1946 births
Martiniquais poets
21st-century pseudonymous writers
20th-century pseudonymous writers
20th-century French writers
21st-century French writers
Living people